Elseya nadibajagu is a Pliocene species of extinct Australian snapping turtle, described from the Bluff Downs region of Queensland, Australia.

References

Elseya (Pelocomastes)
nadibajagu
Pliocene turtles
Fossil taxa described in 1999
Taxa named by Scott A. Thomson
Neogene reptiles of Australia
Turtles of Australia